Pignut Mountain is a mountain in Rappahannock County, Virginia. It is part of the Blue Ridge Mountains.  Its summit lies within Shenandoah National Park.

Geology
Geologically speaking, the mountain is situated in the northern subprovince of the Blue Ridge Province of the Appalachian Highlands.  It is part of the Crystalline Appalachians.  Pignut Mountain is separated from the main Blue Ridge by a low gap.  The gap is the result of relatively rapid erosion along a geological fault.

Visiting Pignut Mountain
As of 2010, Pignut Mountain is entirely undeveloped and there are no trails or roads leading up the mountain. The summit can be reached by bushwhacking from the Hull School Trail, accessible from Skyline Drive.  The closest scenic viewpoints along Skyline Drive from which to view Pignut Mountain are Thornton Hollow Overlook, situated on nearby Neighbor Mountain, Little Devils Stairs Overlook on Hogback Mountain and Rattlesnake Point Overlook on Sugarloaf.  Thornton Hollow Overlook provides a view from the west; Little Devils Stairs Overlook provides a view from the north; and Rattlesnake Point Overlook provides a view from the northwest.

References

Mountains of Virginia
Appalachian Mountains
Mountains of Rappahannock County, Virginia
Blue Ridge Mountains